INS Vikrant (from Sanskrit vikrānta, "courageous") was a  of the Indian Navy. The ship was laid down as HMS Hercules for the British Royal Navy during World War II, but  was put on hold when the war ended. India purchased the incomplete carrier in 1957, and construction was completed in 1961. Vikrant was commissioned as the first aircraft carrier of the Indian Navy and played a key role in enforcing the naval blockade of East Pakistan during the Indo-Pakistani War of 1971.

In its later years, the ship underwent major refits to embark modern aircraft, before being decommissioned in January 1997. She was preserved as a museum ship in Naval Docks, Mumbai until 2012. In January 2014, the ship was sold through an online auction and scrapped in November 2014 after final clearance from the Supreme Court.

History and construction

In 1943 the Royal Navy commissioned six light aircraft carriers in an effort to counter the German and Japanese navies. The 1942 Design Light Fleet Carrier, commonly referred to as the British Light Fleet Carrier, was the result. Serving with eight navies between 1944 and 2001, these ships were designed and constructed by civilian shipyards as an intermediate step between the full-sized fleet aircraft carriers and the less expensive but limited-capability escort carriers.

Sixteen light fleet carriers were ordered, and all were laid down as what became the Colossus class in 1942 and 1943. The final six ships were modified during construction to handle larger and faster aircraft, and were re-designated the Majestic class. The improvements from the Colossus class to the Majestic class included heavier displacement, armament, catapult, aircraft lifts and aircraft capacity. Construction on the ships was suspended at the end of World War II, as the ships were surplus to the Royal Navy's peacetime requirements.
Instead, the carriers were modernized and sold to several Commonwealth nations. The ships were similar, but each varied depending on the requirements of the country to which the ship was sold.

HMS Hercules, the fifth ship in the Majestic class, was ordered on 7 August 1942 and laid down on 14 October 1943 by Vickers-Armstrongs on the River Tyne. After World War II ended with Japan's surrender on 2 September 1945, she was launched on 22 September, and her construction was suspended in May 1946. At the time of suspension, she was 75 per cent complete. Her hull was preserved, and in May 1947 she was laid up in Gareloch off the Clyde. In January 1957, she was purchased by India and was towed to Belfast to complete her construction and modifications by Harland and Wolff. Several improvements to the original design were ordered by the Indian Navy, including an angled deck, steam catapults, and a modified island.  Local "knowledge" in Belfast was that some of the trolley buses being decommissioned at the time left Belfast on Vikrant, to test the new steam catapult on the way to India.

Design and description

She was powered by a pair of Parsons geared steam turbines, driving two propeller shafts, using steam provided by four Admiralty three-drum boilers. The air and ship crew comprised 1,110 officers and men.

The ship was armed with sixteen  Bofors anti-aircraft guns, but these were later reduced to eight. At various times, its aircraft consisted of Hawker Sea Hawk and STOVL BAe Sea Harrier jet fighters, Sea King Mk 42B and HAL Chetak helicopters, and Breguet Br.1050 Alizé  anti-submarine aircraft. The carrier fielded between 21 and 23 aircraft of all types. Larger  lifts were installed.

The ship was equipped with one LW-05 air-search radar, one ZW-06 surface-search radar, one LW-10 tactical radar and one Type 963 aircraft landing radar with other communication systems.

Service
The Indian Navy's first aircraft carrier was commissioned as INS Vikrant on 4 March 1961 in Belfast by Vijaya Lakshmi Pandit, the Indian High Commissioner to the United Kingdom. The name Vikrant was derived from the Sanskrit word vikrānta meaning "stepping beyond", "courageous" or "bold". Captain Pritam Singh Mahindroo was the first commanding officer of the ship. Two squadrons were to be embarked on the 
ship - INAS 300, commanded by Lieutenant Commander B. R. Acharya which had British Hawker Sea Hawk fighter-bombers and INAS 310, commanded by Lieutenant Commander Mihir K. Roy which had French Alizé anti-submarine aircraft. On 18 May 1961, the first jet landed on her deck. It was piloted by Lieutenant Radhakrishna Hariram Tahiliani, who later served as admiral and Chief of the Naval Staff of India from 1984 to 1987. Vikrant formally joined the Indian Navy's fleet in Bombay (now Mumbai) on 3 November 1961, when she was received at Ballard Pier by then Prime Minister Jawaharlal Nehru.

Vikrant did not see action, and patrolled along the coast to deter foreign interference. During the Indo-Pakistani War of 1965, Vikrant was in dry dock refitting, and did not see any action.

In June 1970, Vikrant was docked at the Naval Dockyard, Bombay, due to many internal fatigue cracks and fissures in the water drums of her boilers that could not be repaired by welding. As replacement drums were not available locally, four new ones were ordered from Britain, and Naval Headquarters issued orders not to use the boilers until further notice. On 26 February 1971 the ship was moved from Ballard Pier Extension to the anchorage, without replacement drums. The main objective behind this move was to light up the boilers at reduced pressure, and work up the main and flight deck machinery that had been idle for almost seven months. On 1 March, the boilers were ignited, and basin trials up to 40 revolutions per minute (RPM) were conducted. Catapult trials were conducted on the same day.

The ship began preliminary sea trials on 18 March and returned two days later. Trials were again conducted on 26–27 April. With the growing expectations of a war with Pakistan in the near future, the navy started to transfer its ships to strategically advantageous locations in Indian waters. The primary concern of Naval Headquarters about the operation was the serviceability of Vikrant. When asked his opinion regarding the involvement of Vikrant in the war, Fleet Operations Officer Captain Gulab Mohanlal Hiranandani told the Chief of the Naval Staff Admiral Sardarilal Mathradas Nanda:

Nanda and Hiranandani proved to be instrumental in taking Vikrant to war. There were objections that the ship might have severe operational difficulties that would expose the carrier to increased danger on operations. In addition, the three s acquired by the Pakistan Navy posed a significant risk to the carrier. In June, extensive deep sea trials were carried out, with steel safety harnesses around the three boilers still operational. Observation windows were fitted as a precautionary measure, to detect any steam leaks. By the end of June, the trials were complete and Vikrant was cleared to participate on operations, with its speed restricted to 14 knots.

Indo-Pakistani War of 1971

As a part of preparations for the war, Vikrant was assigned to the Eastern Naval Command, then to the Eastern Fleet. The main reason behind strengthening the Eastern Fleet was to counter the Pakistani maritime forces deployed in support of military operations in East Bengal. Any ship in this area was to be challenged and checked. If found to be neutral, it would be escorted to the nearest Indian port, otherwise, it would be captured, and taken as a war prize.

In the meantime, intelligence reports confirmed that Pakistan was to deploy a US-built , . Ghazi was considered as a serious threat to Vikrant by the Indian Navy, as Vikrants approximate position would be known by the Pakistanis once she started operating aircraft. Of the four available surface ships, INS Kavaratti had no sonar, which meant that the other three had to remain in close vicinity  of Vikrant, without which the carrier would be completely vulnerable to attack by Ghazi.

On 23 July, Vikrant sailed off to Cochin in company with the Western Fleet. En route, before reaching Cochin on 26 July, Sea King landing trials were carried out. After the completion of the radar and communication trials on 28 July, she departed for Madras, escorted by Brahmaputra and Beas. The next major problem was operating aircraft from the carrier. The commanding officer of the ship, Captain (later Vice Admiral) S. Prakash, was seriously concerned about flight operations. He was concerned that aircrew morale would be adversely affected if flight operations were not undertaken, which could be disastrous. Naval Headquarters remained stubborn on the speed restrictions, and sought confirmation from Prakash whether it was possible to embark an Alizé without compromising the speed restrictions. The speed restrictions imposed by the headquarters meant that Alizé aircraft would have to land at close to stalling speed. Eventually the aircraft weight was reduced, which allowed several of the aircraft to embark, along with a Seahawk squadron.

By the end of September, Vikrant and her escorts reached Port Blair. En route to Visakhapatnam, tactical exercises were conducted in the presence of the Flag Officer Commanding-in-Chief of the Eastern Naval Command. From Vishakhapatnam, Vikrant set out for Madras for maintenance. Rear Admiral S. H. Sharma was appointed Flag Officer Commanding Eastern Fleet and arrived at Vishakhapatnam on 14 October. After receiving the reports that Pakistan might launch preemptive strikes, maintenance was stopped for another tactical exercise, which was completed during the night of 26–27 October at Vishakhapatnam. Vikrant then returned to Madras to resume maintenance. On 1 November, the Eastern Fleet was formally constituted, and on 13 November, all the ships set out for the Andaman and Nicobar Islands. To avoid misadventures, it was planned to sail Vikrant to a remote anchorage, isolating it from combat. Simultaneously, deception signals would give the impression that Vikrant was operating somewhere between Madras and Vishakhapatnam.

On 23 November, an emergency was declared in Pakistan after a clash of Indian and Pakistani troops in East Pakistan two days earlier. On 2 December, the Eastern Fleet proceeded to its patrol area in anticipation of an attack by Pakistan. The Pakistan Navy had deployed Ghazi on 14 November with the explicit goal of targeting and sinking Vikrant, and Ghazi reached a location near Madras by the 23rd.

Ghazi, meanwhile, sank off the Visakhapatnam coast under mysterious circumstances. On the night of 3–4 December, a muffled underwater explosion was detected by a coastal battery. The next morning, a local fisherman observed flotsam near the coast, causing Indian naval officials to suspect a vessel had sunk off the coast. The next day, a clearance diving team was sent to search the area, and they confirmed that Ghazi had sunk in shallow waters.

The reason for Ghazis fate is unclear. The Indian Navy's official historian, Hiranandani, suggests three possibilities, after having analysed the position of the rudder and extent of the damage suffered. The first was that Ghazi had come up to periscope depth to identify her position and may have seen an anti-submarine vessel that caused her to crash dive, which in turn may have led her to bury her bow in the bottom. The second possibility is closely related to the first: on the night of the explosion, Rajput was on patrol off Visakhapatnam and observed a severe disturbance in the water. Suspecting that it was a submarine, the ship dropped two depth charges on the spot, on a position that was very close to the wreckage. The third possibility is that there was a mishap when Ghazi was laying mines on the day before hostilities broke out.

Vikrant was redeployed towards Chittagong at the outbreak of hostilities. On 4 December, the ship's Sea Hawks struck shipping in Chittagong and Cox's Bazar harbours, sinking or incapacitating most of the ships present. Later strikes targeted Khulna and the Port of Mongla, which continued until 10 December, while other operations were flown to support a naval blockade of East Pakistan. On 14 December, the Sea Hawks attacked the cantonment area in Chittagong, destroying several Pakistani army barracks. Medium anti-aircraft fire was encountered during this strike. Simultaneous attacks by Alizés continued on Cox's Bazar. After this, Vikrants fuel levels dropped to less than 25 per cent, and the aircraft carrier sailed to Paradip for refueling. The crew of INS Vikrant earned two Maha Vir Chakras and twelve Vir Chakra gallantry medals for their part in the war.

Later years

Vikrant did not see much service after the war, and was given two major modernisation refits—the first one from 1979 to 1981 and the second one from 1987 to 1989. In the first phase, her boilers, radars, communication systems  and anti-aircraft guns were modernised, and facilities to operate Sea Harriers were installed. In the second phase, facilities to operate the new Sea Harrier Vertical/Short Take Off and Land (V/STOL) fighter aircraft and the new Sea King Mk 42B Anti-Submarine Warfare (ASW) helicopters were introduced. A 9.75-degree ski-jump ramp was fitted. The steam catapult was removed during this phase. Again in 1991, Vikrant underwent a six-month refit, followed by another fourteen-month refit in 1992–94. She remained operational thereafter, flying Sea Harriers, Sea Kings and Chetaks until her final sea outing on 23 November 1994. In the same year, a fire was also recorded aboard. In January 1995, the navy decided to keep Vikrant in "safe to float" state. She was laid up and formally decommissioned on 31 January 1997.

Squadrons embarked

During her service, INS Vikrant embarked four squadrons of the Naval Air Arm of the Indian Navy:

Commanding officers

Museum ship

Following decommissioning in 1997, the ship was earmarked for preservation as a museum ship in Mumbai. Lack of funding prevented progress on the ship's conversion to a museum and it was speculated that the ship would be made into a training ship. In 2001, the ship was opened to the public by the Indian Navy, but the Government of Maharashtra was unable to find a partner to operate the museum on a permanent, long-term basis and the museum was closed after it was deemed unsafe for the public in 2012.

Scrapping

In August 2013, Vice Admiral Shekhar Sinha, Commander-in-Chief of the Western Naval Command, said the Ministry of Defence would scrap the ship as she had become very difficult to maintain and no private bidders had offered to fund the museum's operations. On 3 December 2013, the Indian government decided to auction the ship. The Bombay High Court dismissed a public-interest lawsuit filed by Kiran Paigankar to stop the auction, stating the vessel's dilapidated condition did not warrant her preservation, nor were the necessary funds or government support available.

The Supreme Court of India dismissed another lawsuit challenging the ship's sale and scrapping on 14 August 2014. Vikrant remained beached off Darukhana in Mumbai Port while awaiting the final clearances of the Mumbai Port Trust. On 12 November 2014, the Supreme Court gave its final approval for the carrier to be scrapped, which commenced on 22 November 2014.

On 7 April 2022, an FIR against an ex-MP Kirit Somaiya, his son Neil, and others was registered, on charges of alleged cheating and criminal breach of trust linked to the collection of funds up to Rs. 57 crore for restoring the decommissioned aircraft carrier INS Vikrant. The Trombay Police booked them under Section 420 (cheating and dishonesty including delivery of property) and Section 406 (punishment for criminal breach of trust) and Section 34 (common intentions) of the Indian Penal Code.

According to the complaint, the father and son duo collected the money in 2013-14 in the name of restoring Vikrant, but the funds collected were spent on personal use.

Somaiya was leading the front of attacking the government's intent of commercializing the decommissioned ship by handing it to private players.

Legacy

In memory of Vikrant, the Vikrant Memorial was unveiled by Vice Admiral Surinder Pal Singh Cheema, Flag Officer Commanding-in-Chief of the Western Naval Command at K Subash Marg in the Naval Dockyard of Mumbai on 25 January 2016. The memorial is made from metal recovered from the ship.
In February 2016, Bajaj unveiled a new motorbike made with metal from Vikrants scrap and named it Bajaj V in honour of Vikrant.

The navy has named its first home-built carrier INS Vikrant in honour of INS Vikrant (R11). The new carrier is built by Cochin Shipyard Limited, and will displace . The keel was laid down in February 2009 and she was launched in August 2013. The ship was commissioned on 2 September 2022 by PM Narendra modi

In popular culture
The decommissioned ship featured prominently in the film ABCD 2 as a backdrop while it was moored near Darukhana in Mumbai.

See also

Footnotes

References

Bibliography

External links

 Mission Vikrant 1971: A search for our heroes
 Sons of Vikrant by Bajaj

World War II aircraft carriers of the United Kingdom
Majestic-class aircraft carriers of the Indian Navy
1945 ships
Ships built by Harland and Wolff
Ships built in Barrow-in-Furness
Ships built in Belfast
Military and war museums in India